"Final Mission" is the 83rd episode of the American science fiction television series Star Trek: The Next Generation, and the ninth episode of the fourth season.

Set in the 24th century, the series follows the adventures of the Starfleet crew of the Federation starship Enterprise-D. In this episode, after learning that he finally has been accepted into Starfleet Academy, Wesley Crusher welcomes Picard's invitation to accompany him on an away mission that could resolve a mining dispute on an arid world. But following a shuttle crash and a near disastrous search for water that leaves the captain near death, Wesley finds himself charged with the weighty responsibility of keeping both himself and Picard alive until a rescue team can locate them.

Plot
The Enterprise has traveled to the Pentarus system where Captain Picard (Patrick Stewart) must mediate a dispute among some miners on the fifth planet. Wesley Crusher (Wil Wheaton) receives word that he has been accepted to Starfleet Academy and, for his final mission, he will accompany Picard on his shuttle trip to Pentarus V. A distress call comes in from Gamilon V, where an unidentified vessel has entered orbit and is giving off lethal doses of radiation. Picard orders Riker to take the Enterprise to resolve that situation while he and Wesley travel in a shuttle sent by the miners, commanded by Captain Dirgo.

En route, Dirgo's shuttle malfunctions and they are forced to crash-land on the surface of a harsh, desert-like moon. Though they are unharmed, the shuttle is beyond repair, and its communication systems and food replicators are disabled. Dirgo admits he has no emergency supplies on board, so they are forced to search for shelter and water. With his tricorder, Wesley identifies some caves and a potential source of water some distance away, and the three set out across the desert. Reaching a cave, they find a fountain-like water source, but it is protected by a crystalline force field. Dirgo attempts to use his phaser to destroy the field, but this activates a burst of energy from the fountain which encases the phaser in an impenetrable shell and causes a rock slide; Picard pushes Wesley out of the way but is severely injured in doing so.

Meanwhile, the Enterprise has arrived at Gamilon V, finding the unidentified ship is an abandoned 300 year old garbage scow filled with radioactive waste. Their initial attempt to attach thrusters to the barge to propel it through an asteroid belt into the Gamilon sun remotely fails, and Commander Riker (Jonathan Frakes) is forced to attempt to tow the barge themselves using the tractor beam, exposing the crew to the lethal radiation.

As Wesley continues to analyze the force field, Dirgo becomes impatient and attempts to breach the field again with Picard phaser with help from a reluctant Wesley firing a phaser, but this time the energy burst encases Dirgo as well, killing him. Picard, weak from his injuries, gives Wesley advice about the academy, and tells him he is proud of him. Wesley tells Picard that the captain has taught him to never give up. Meanwhile, on the Enterprise, despite the rising radiation levels on board, which are nearing lethal, Riker manages to get the barge headed into the sun and speeds off to help in the search for the shuttle.

Wesley continues to study the fountain, and devises a plan to disable the force field. He jury-rigs his combadge and tricorder. He fires his phaser at the fountain to attract the energy defense mechanism, but reprograms it using his tricorder to manipulate the energy burst which passes through him and instead destroys the force field and is finally able to access the water.

Shortly thereafter, the Enterprise locates the wreckage of the mining shuttle, and Picard and Wesley are rescued. As Picard is carried from the cave, he tells Wesley that he will be missed.

Reception
In a ranking of every Star Trek: The Next Generation episode, "Final Mission" was ranked 144th by Medium in 2016.

Releases 
"Final Mission" was released in the United States on September 3, 2002, as part of the Star Trek: The Next Generation season four DVD box set.

On April 23, 1996, episodes "The Loss" and "Final Mission" were released on LaserDisc in the United States by Paramount Home Video. Both episodes were included on a single double sided 12 inch optical disc, with a Dolby Surround sound track.

References

 Star Trek The Next Generation DVD set, volume 4, disc 3, selection 1.

External links
 
 "Final Mission" rewatch by Ketih R. A.DeCandido

Star Trek: The Next Generation (season 4) episodes
1990 American television episodes